Dominus illuminatio mea (Latin for 'The Lord is my light') is the incipit (opening words) of Psalm 27 and is used by the University of Oxford as its motto. It has been in use there since at least the second half of the sixteenth century, and it appears in the coat of arms of the university.

An article written in 2000 by the Roman Catholic priest and theologian Ivan Illich (1926–2002) may help to explain this ancient university motto, at a time when scientists were progressively replacing the concept of vision as a gaze radiating from the pupil by the concept of vision as the retinal perception of an image formed by reflected sunlight:

Other uses 
Dominus illuminatio mea is also the motto of Loyola High School (Kolkata) in India, founded in 1961.

It is one of the two mottos of Robert College in Istanbul, and it has appeared in the arms of the Robert College Alumni Association since 1957, next to Veritas.

It is also the motto of Finlandia University, founded as Suomi College in 1896.

Additionally, it is the motto of Cair Paravel-Latin School, a private college-preparatory school in Topeka, Kansas, and Nazareth Academy in Rochester, New York. It is also used by St Leo's College, University of Queensland, and by Drew University in Madison, NJ.

It is found in the coat of arms of Montessori Professional College in Quezon City.

Furthermore, it is the motto of Hallfield Independent School in Birmingham, UK, and Marymount Secondary School in Hong Kong, as well as Gregorian Public School in Kerala, India.

References 

Latin mottos
Culture of the University of Oxford